Matthew Brumlow is an American stage actor based in Chicago, Illinois. Brumlow has been a member of the American Blues Theater since 2001. He has starred in numerous productions and has received critical acclaim for many of his roles. He has twice been nominated for an Equity Jeff Award for his work as an actor in Chicago. he recently starred in a one-man show about the life of Hank Williams Sr. entitled, "Nobody Lonesome for Me."  In March 2011, Brumlow was named one of the "50 most beautiful Chicagoans" by Chicago Magazine.

Feature films include: "Endings" and "Where We Started." Both films were directed by Chris Hansen (Theoretical Entertainment).

Brumlow graduated summa cum laude from Lee University in 1996  winning the F.J. Lee Award bestowed by a vote of the faculty upon the student considered to be the most outstanding all-around Lee University senior.  He served as the 36th President of Upsilon Xi. He also holds a master's degree from Northwestern University.

Footnotes

Living people
Lee University alumni
Year of birth missing (living people)
American male stage actors